Lamprosema guttalis is a species of moth of the family Crambidae described by Pierre Viette in 1958. It can be found in Madagascar.

Its wingspan is 27–28 mm, with a length of the forewings of 13–14 mm. This species looks close to Lamprosema kingdoni (Butler, 1879).

The holotype had been collected in 1955 near Périnet (Analamazoatra Reserve).

References 

Lamprosema
Moths of Madagascar
Moths of Africa